The thirteenth season of American Idol, styled as American Idol XIII, premiered on the Fox television network on January 15, 2014. Ryan Seacrest returned as host for his thirteenth season. Keith Urban was the only judge from the twelfth season to return. Former judge Jennifer Lopez, who returned after a one-season absence, and new judge and Harry Connick Jr. both joined the judging panel following the departures of Mariah Carey, Nicki Minaj, and Randy Jackson, though Jackson returned as a mentor, replacing Jimmy Iovine.

On May 21, Caleb Johnson was announced the winner and Jena Irene was the runner-up.

Changes

There were a number of other major changes in the season, from the judges to the format of the show itself including the opening intro, which used the "Gyroscope 2.0". On May 9, 2013, Randy Jackson announced that he would no longer serve as a judge. On May 30, 2013, Mariah Carey and Nicki Minaj also announced they would not return to the judging panel. On August 1, 2013, it was confirmed that Keith Urban would return as a judge for another season. Executive producers Nigel Lythgoe and Ken Warwick were succeeded by Per Blankens, previously of Idol, the Swedish version of the Idols format. On June 25, 2013, it was confirmed that producers Jesse Ignjatovic and Evan Prager would join Blankens as executive producers of the show.  Bill DeRonde replaced Warwick as a director of the audition episodes, and Louis J. Horvitz also replaced Gregg Gelfand as a director of the show, who had been directing since the sixth season. Fox television executive Mike Darnell who helped launch American Idol in 2002 left as programming head of Fox, and Fox Sports executive David Hill was hired to oversee the series.  Rickey Minor returned to the show as musical director after having left at the end of the ninth season to go to The Tonight Show with Jay Leno.

In August 2013, Jennifer Lopez's boyfriend Casper Smart stated Lopez would be returning as an American Idol judge. On August 22, 2013, it was reported that Jimmy Iovine would not return as the in-house mentor for this season, but he is to be replaced by former judge Randy Jackson. On August 30, 2013, The Hollywood Reporter wrote that Harry Connick Jr. signed a deal to join the panel as the third judge and that Simon Fuller held a party the night before with all three judges on hand to toast the forthcoming announcement. On September 3, 2013, Lopez and Connick Jr. were officially announced as judges for this season along with the confirmation of Jackson being the new mentor. Lopez is the first American Idol judge to return after leaving at the end of the eleventh season. It was also later reported that Idol alumni Adam Lambert and Chris Daughtry would be assisting Jackson in mentoring the contestants.

In a rules change from past seasons, semifinalists from the twelfth season (but not previous seasons) who were not in the top 10, nor on the tour and the age limit past above 28, were eligible to return, provided they met all other requirements. This season the viewers may also vote for their favorite contestants via Google Search, bringing the total number of ways the viewers can vote to five (the other four methods were by phone, texting, supervote online on americanidol.com and with American Idol App on mobile devices), with the number of votes limited to 50 for each method of voting. This season AT&T ended their sponsorship and it is therefore possible to text-vote with other service providers. Idol teamed up with Facebook to present "on-air visualizations" showing real-time East Coast voting developments, including live "demographic voting trends and relative contestant rankings".  Voting may also start as soon as the performance shows start this season, and real time vote rankings were shown while the show is still in progress, and each contestant were assigned the same telephone number all through the competition.

Regional auditions
Auditions took place in the following cities:

In addition, special audition bus tours were held in Little Rock, Arkansas; Oxford, Mississippi; Tuscaloosa, Alabama; Knoxville, Tennessee; and Winston-Salem, North Carolina.  Those chosen proceeded on to Salt Lake City to audition in front of the judges.

An auditioner this season was Tristen Langley, son of first season's third-placed finalist Nikki McKibbin, who made history as the first of the second-generation contestants on American Idol. He was eliminated in the "Hollywood or Home" round.

Hollywood week
A special "Hollywood or Home" round was introduced this season whereby contestants were eliminated soon after they have landed in LAX airport before they even reached Hollywood. 52 contestants the judges were uncertain of performed solo in an airplane hangar, and 32 were sent back to the airport.  The 160 contestants left then proceeded on to Hollywood and performed solo in the Dolby Theatre in groups of ten.  After this round, 104 contestants remained where they performed in groups of three or four. 77 contestants went through to a further solo round.

The Hollywood rounds ended with a Top 30 being announced on February 12 and 13, 2014. However, a new twist was added and the judges chose only 15 girls and 14 boys, with the "15th boy" to be chosen by the voting public.  The options were Ben Briley or Neco Starr. The result of the vote and the name of the public's choice to complete the Top 30 was announced on February 18. Ben Briley made the Top 30,since he had got mare public votes than Neco Starr.

Semi-finals
The semi-finals round started on February 18. The three-day event on February 18, 19 and 20 was marketed as "Rush Week." Below are the two semi-final groups (females and males) with contestants listed in their performance order. The top five males and the top five females, along with the three wild card choices by the judges, advanced to the finals.

In a controversial twist, the judges eliminated five of each gender before they even had a chance to perform in front of the live studio audience. The females started the semifinal round, and the males continued on following night's episode, and the contestants performed songs of their choice (there was no particular theme).

Semi-finalists

The following is a list of the Top 30 semi-finalists who were not allowed to sing during "Rush Week":

The following is a list of Top 20 semi-finalists who failed to reach the finals:

The aforementioned contestants and three finalists outside of the top 10 will be eligible to audition for the fourteenth season.

 Casey Thrasher auditioned for the fourteenth season, but he was cut at top 48.
 Bria Anai, Jordan Brisbane, Ethan Harris, Briston Maroney, Maurice Townsend, Marrialle Sellars, and Emmanuel Zidor auditioned for the fourteenth season, but they were cut before they could see the judges.

Color key:

Wild Card round
Following those ten singers advancing on Thursday, February 20, five of the remaining ten semi-finalists were selected by the judges to compete in the Wild Card round. The Wild Card round immediately began, following the announcement of the ten finalists. Following another performance by each Wild Card contender, the judges then selected three contestants to advance to the final group of 13. For their performances, the contestants prepared to reprise their third round Hollywood solos for consideration. Jena Irene and Spencer Lloyd each performed their own, respective original songs.

Finalists

 Caleb Johnson (born April 23, 1991) is from Asheville, North Carolina. He previously auditioned in the tenth and eleventh seasons, but he was cut off during the selection of top 25. He auditioned in Atlanta where he performed an original song "Into the Void".  In the Hollywood round he first performed "Sympathy for the Devil", followed a performance of "Too Close" in a group which included CJ Harris, and "Radioactive" for the last solo. He was announced as the winner on May 21. Johnson is the second returning contestant to win Idol after Candice Glover in the previous season.

 Jena Irene (born July 13, 1996) is from Farmington Hills, Michigan. She auditioned in Detroit with Adele's "Rolling in the Deep".  She performed "Video Games" during the Hollywood for the first solo, Alex Clare's "Too Close" for the group round, and her own composition "Unbreakable Me" for the Final Judgement. She cites Paramore and Incubus as her greatest musical influences. She is the first female Wild Card contestant and the second Wild Card contestant after Clay Aiken in the second season to advance to the finale. She was announced as the runner-up.

 Alex Preston (born May 6, 1993) is from Mont Vernon, New Hampshire.  He performed an original song "Fairytales" for his audition. During Hollywood week, he performed "Scream and Shout" for the first solo, and his own composition "Fairytales" for the final solo. He was eliminated on May 15, 2014, and came in third place. Prior to his elimination, Preston had never been in the bottom 3 or in the bottom 2 before.

 Jessica Meuse (born October 19, 1990, in Round Rock, Texas) is from Slapout, Alabama. She auditioned in Atlanta singing one of her own songs, "Blue-Eyed Lie". She reprised the song for the top 8 and sung another original, "Done", during Hollywood Week. Prior to auditioning she had written over sixty original songs and self-released a debut album, called "What's So Hard About Bein' a Man", in 2011. She was eliminated on May 8, coming in fourth place.

 Sam Woolf (born April 19, 1996) is from Bradenton, Florida. He auditioned in Boston, singing "Lego House" by Ed Sheeran. He sang "Waiting on the World to Change" on the first round in Hollywood, and his original composition entitled "I Tried" in the final solo of the Hollywood Round. He was saved from elimination by the judges after receiving the lowest number of votes in the top eight round. He was eliminated on May 1, coming  in fifth place.

C.J. Harris (born January 28, 1991, died January 15, 2023)  is from Jasper, Alabama. He auditioned in Salt Lake City, where he sang "Soulshine". He performed "Trouble" in the first Hollywood round, and was in a group with fellow finalist Caleb Johnson, performing the Alex Clare song "Too Close". For the final solo he performed "Bring It On Home to Me", however, he was asked to perform again in the Final Judgement to compete against Casey Thrasher, and chose to sing "Whipping Post". He was eliminated on April 24, coming in sixth place. Harris died on January 15, 2023, after suffering a heart attack, making him the sixth American Idol finalist to die, following Willie Spence in 2022, Nikki McKibbin in 2020, Leah LaBelle in 2018, Rickey Smith in 2016, and Michael Johns in 2014.

 Dexter Roberts (born July 12, 1991) is from Fayette, Alabama.  He performed "Drive" for his audition, and for the group round he was part of the group Backstreet Cowboys together with Casey Thrasher and fellow finalist Ben Briley, performing the song "I Want It That Way".  For the final solo he performed an original song, "Farmer's Grandson". He was eliminated on April 17, 2014, coming in seventh place.

 Malaya Watson (born September 24, 1997) is from Southfield, Michigan. She is a tuba player of the marching band of Southfield High School. She auditioned in Detroit with Aretha Franklin's "Ain't No Way". In the first round in Hollywood, she sang "Brand New Me" by Alicia Keys. She performed "I Believe" in the final solo on Hollywood round. She cites her two grandfathers and her father as her personal musical influences. She described her style in singing from Sly Stone and Beyoncé. She is the second youngest contestant in American Idol history that has reached the live show, next to tenth season contestant, Thia Megia. She was eliminated on April 10, coming in eighth place.

 Majesty Rose (born February 29, 1992) is from Goldsboro, North Carolina. She auditioned in Atlanta, where she sang Coldplay's "Violet Hill". Prior on auditioning, she was a pre-school teacher and she graduated in Eastern Wayne High School on 2011. In Hollywood, she performed "1234" and "Stars". She was eliminated on March 27, coming in ninth place.

 MK Nobilette (born August 20, 1993) is from San Francisco, California. She auditioned in San Francisco with "If I Were Your Woman," and advanced to Hollywood, where she was one of many contestants who had to "sing for their lives," or get back on the plane home. For the Hollywood rounds she chose an Allen Stone song for the a cappella round, which was not aired. She performed "Royals" in the group round.  For her final Hollywood solo she did "The A Team" by Ed Sheeran. She is the first openly gay finalist to be publicly acknowledged on the show. She was eliminated on March 20, 2014, and came in tenth place. She also did not appear or sing in the live finale, due to being ill at that time.

 Ben Briley (born March 19, 1989) is from Gallatin, Tennessee. He auditioned in Atlanta, singing "Arms of a Woman". He performed "Stars" in the final solo of the Hollywood Round, and was in a group called Backstreet Cowboys with fellow finalist Dexter Roberts, performing the Backstreet Boys song "I Want It That Way".  Ben Briley and Neco Starr both appeared before the judges for the Final Judgement, however the judges could not decide whom to choose, and sent both to a vote by fans, which was won by Briley. He was eliminated on March 13, coming in eleventh place.

 Emily Piriz (born January 28, 1996) is from Orlando, Florida. She auditioned in Atlanta, singing "Mamma Knows Best" by Jessie J. She sang "Nothing but the Water" on the first round in Hollywood. She performed "Stars" in the final solo of the Hollywood Round. Prior on joining this competition, she also auditioned in The X Factor USA. She cites Pink and Kelly Clarkson as her musical influences. She was eliminated on March 6, coming in twelfth place.

Kristen O'Connor (born April 19, 1989) is from Sebastian, Florida. She auditioned in Atlanta, singing "Good Morning Heartache". She performed "Treasure" in the Hollywood group rounds with her fellow finalist, Sam Woolf. She performed "Unconditionally" on the Hollywood Rounds.  She cites Christina Aguilera and Jessie J as her musical influences. Prior on joining this competition, she was a nurse. She was eliminated on February 27, coming in thirteenth place. She is the fifth wild card finalist to be the eliminated first in the finals, with her predecessors Leah LaBelle, Jasmine Murray, Ashthon Jones and Jeremy Rosado.

Live shows details
In this season, there are 13 weeks of the finals and 13 finalists, with one finalist eliminated per week based on the American public's votes. Kelly Clarkson's "Breakaway" is used as the send-off song played when a contestant is eliminated, using the eliminated contestant's version of the song (except Caleb Johnson, Jena Irene, Sam Woolf, and Majesty Rose). Former judge Randy Jackson replaced Jimmy Iovine as the weekly mentor to the contestants.

Color key:

Top 13 – This Is Me

Top 12 – Home

Top 11 – Songs from the Cinema

Top 10 – Billboard Top 10 Charts
The finalists picked songs from Top 10 Billboard charts from 2011 to 2014. Starting this week, the studio versions of each contestant performance are available at iTunes.

Top 9 – (I'm with the) Band!
The finalists performed as lead singer of the show's band, singing songs of their choice.

Top 8 (first week) – Back to the Start
The finalists reprised the songs they performed when they first auditioned (with Jessica Meuse and Alex Preston each performing their own, respective original compositions, and Caleb Johnson and Dexter Roberts to perform their secondary non-aired audition songs). They also performed duets for the first time this season.

Top 8 (second week) – Songs from the 1980s
Guest Mentor: David Cook

Top 7 – Competitors' Choice
Every finalist chose a song for each remaining contestant, who then selected one song choice to perform. The songs used for the duets and trios were not a product of the theme.

Top 6 – Rock 'n' Roll / Country
For the first time in the competition, each finalist sang two songs each: one from the rock 'n' roll genre, and the other from the country genre.

Top 5 – America's Choice
The finalists sang songs requested by the voting public. Jason Mraz served as the guest mentor this week.

Top 4 – Love: Break-Ups, Dedications, and Make-Ups
The finalists sang three rounds of songs about love: the first dealing with breakups, the second dealing with personal dedications to others, and the third dealing with make-ups.

Top 3 – Randy Jackson's Choice / Judges' Choice / Hometown's Choice
The finalists sang two new songs chosen by the judges and in-house mentor Randy Jackson; the third was a reprisal of a previous performance, selected by the finalists' hometowns. This episode also marked its 500th episode overall.

Top 2 – Simon Fuller's Choice / Favorite Performance / Winner's Single
This week, the final two contestants sang a song chosen by the show's creator, a reprisal of one song from their previous appearance on the show this season, and a winner's song.

Elimination chart
Color key:

Results show performances

Controversy

Caleb Johnson comment
During his interview with AfterBuzz TV following the Top 5 elimination show, Caleb Johnson made offensive remarks about his fans who tweet him song suggestions.  "[Twitter] gives access to a bunch of retards to talk to me," Caleb said. "I don't really enjoy having to see somebody telling me what song I have to sing. I think at this point of the competition, I can pick and choose my own songs and represent me. I don't need 10,000 people saying, 'You should sing this, you should sing that. Listen to me!' Fortunately, guys, I'm going to listen to myself, whether you like it or not."

His comment has been described as "arrogant", with some fans turning against him. After his fans expressed outrage on Twitter, Caleb issued an apology on his Facebook page.  "For the record that juvenile comment I made in the interview was not directed towards my fans but to the wackos that send hundreds of hate messages a day to me! You guys are amazing and I cannot thank you enough for your support. Sorry if it offended anybody it was the wrong choice of words. Also I greatly appreciate it when you guys give me song suggestions but it gets really overwhelming at the volume it comes in so please understand ! Rock on !:)"

Reception

U.S. Nielsen ratings

Live + same day ratings

For the first time in nearly twelve years, an American Idol episode dropped beneath the ten-million viewer mark.  This occurred on February 18, 2014.  The last time an episode was below this mark was July 24, 2002. 

Live + 7 day (DVR) ratings

Critical response

Harry Connick Jr. was lauded for his performance as a judge. USA Today, Rolling Stone, and MTV all claimed that he "stole the spotlight" during the season premiere with his humor and knowledgeable feedback. Kristin Dos Santos of E! Online suggested that Connick Jr. could save the struggling show. She called him better than Simon Cowell, writing that while he is "brutally honest", he also shows heart. Robert Rorke of the New York Post wrote that Connick Jr. was unlikely to "save" American Idol, but also wrote that he made the show watchable again by bringing class and keeping the focus on the contestants. Kieth Urban was also lauded as a judge, and his chemistry with Harry Contick Jr was considered one of the highlights of the season.

The "Rush Week" twist was not well received by critics. As described by Lyndsey Parker of Yahoo TV, "The other five just sat backstage for a couple hours (while their loved ones sat in the audience), waited in vain for their names to be called, and eventually went home." Furthermore, Amy Reiter of the Los Angeles Times stated, "Like the women, once 10 of the guys were given the chance to compete for our votes, the five remaining...were collectively shuffled before us, looking stunned and solemn, and then sent home, this time with a few tepidly encouraging parting words from the judges."

Music releases
Music releases

Concert tour
American Idols LIVE! Tour 2014

Notes

References

External links
 

American Idol seasons
2014 American television seasons
Television shows directed by Louis J. Horvitz